European route E 127 is a Class A north-south reference European route that connects Western Siberia with eastern Kazakhstan, spanning .

Itinerary

The E 127 routes through Russia and Kazakhstan:

: Omsk – Karaman

: Karaman – Pavlodar – Semey – Georgiyevka
Georgiyevka - Maykapshagay (at the border to China).

Maykapshagay is the easternmost place reached by a European route, and is located about 150 km from the place that is farthest from the ocean.

See also
 Asian Highway 60

External links 
 UN Economic Commission for Europe: Overall Map of E-road Network (2007)

127
E127
E127